The Coldest Winter in Peking is a 1981 Taiwanese drama film directed by Pai Ching-jui, set in the Chinese capital Peking (Beijing) during the Cultural Revolution. The film is strongly anti-communist and was banned not only in mainland China but also in British Hong Kong.

Cast
Charlie Chin
Sibelle Hu
Liu Yen-fang
George Wang
Ko Chun-hsiung
Sihung Lung
Gua Ah-leh
Chang Feng
Tsao Chien
Chin Han
Tien Feng
Kwan Shan

Awards and nominations
1981 18th Golden Horse Awards
Won—Best Supporting Actor (George Wang)
Nominated—Best Film
Nominated—Best Actress (Sibelle Hu)
Nominated—Best Supporting Actor (Liu Yen-fang)
Nominated—Best Editing (Wang Chin-chen)

References

External links

Films set in Beijing
Films about the Cultural Revolution
Central Motion Picture Corporation films
Taiwanese drama films